The 1999 Tro-Bro Léon was the 16th edition of the Tro-Bro Léon cycle race and was held on 30 May 1999. The race was won by Jean-Michel Thilloy.

General classification

References

1999
1999 in road cycling
1999 in French sport
May 1999 sports events in Europe